Paulo Vítor Fagundes dos Anjos, known as Paulo Vítor (born 21 November 1988) is a Brazilian football player who plays for G.D. Chaves.

Club career
He made his professional debut in the Segunda Liga for Varzim on 9 March 2016 in a game against Académico de Viseu.

References

External links

1988 births
Sportspeople from Espírito Santo
Living people
Brazilian footballers
Brazilian expatriate footballers
Vitória Futebol Clube (ES) players
Botafogo Futebol Clube (SP) players
Audax Rio de Janeiro Esporte Clube players
Rio Branco Atlético Clube players
Varzim S.C. players
Rio Ave F.C. players
G.D. Chaves players
Primeira Liga players
Liga Portugal 2 players
Association football goalkeepers
Brazilian expatriate sportspeople in Portugal
Expatriate footballers in Portugal